In mathematics, an asymptotic expansion, asymptotic series or Poincaré expansion (after Henri Poincaré) is a formal series of functions which has the property that truncating the series after a finite number of terms provides an approximation to a given function as the argument of the function tends towards a particular, often infinite, point. Investigations by  revealed that the divergent part of an asymptotic expansion is latently meaningful, i.e. contains information about the exact value of the expanded function.

The most common type of asymptotic expansion is a power series in either positive or negative powers. Methods of generating such expansions include the Euler–Maclaurin summation formula and integral transforms such as the Laplace and Mellin transforms. Repeated integration by parts will often lead to an asymptotic expansion.

Since a convergent Taylor series fits the definition of asymptotic expansion as well, the phrase "asymptotic series" usually implies a non-convergent series. Despite non-convergence, the asymptotic expansion is useful when truncated to a finite number of terms. The approximation may provide benefits by being more mathematically tractable than the function being expanded, or by an increase in the speed of computation of the expanded function. Typically, the best approximation is given when the series is truncated at the smallest term. This way of optimally truncating an asymptotic expansion is known as superasymptotics. The error is then typically of the form  where  is the expansion parameter. The error is thus beyond all orders in the expansion parameter. It is possible to improve on the superasymptotic error, e.g. by employing resummation methods such as Borel resummation to the divergent tail. Such methods are often referred to as hyperasymptotic approximations.

See asymptotic analysis and big O notation for the notation used in this article.

Formal definition

First we define an asymptotic scale, and then give the formal definition of an asymptotic expansion.

If  is a sequence of continuous functions on some domain, and if  is a limit point of the domain, then the sequence constitutes an asymptotic scale if for every ,

 

( may be taken to be infinity.) In other words, a sequence of functions is an asymptotic scale if each function in the sequence grows strictly slower (in the limit ) than the preceding function.

If  is a continuous function on the domain of the asymptotic scale, then  has an asymptotic expansion of order  with respect to the scale as a formal series 

 

if

or the weaker condition

is satisfied. If one or the other holds for all , then we write

Examples

 Gamma function (Stirling's approximation)
 Exponential integral
 Logarithmic integral
This expansion is valid for all complex s and is often used to compute the zeta function by using a large enough value of N, for instance .
 Error function where  is the double factorial.

Worked example
Asymptotic expansions often occur when an ordinary series is used in a formal expression that forces the taking of values outside of its domain of convergence. Thus, for example, one may start with the ordinary series

after the substitution  on the right hand side. The integral on the left hand side, understood as a Cauchy principal value, can be expressed in terms of the exponential integral. The integral on the right hand side may be recognized as the gamma function. Evaluating both, one obtains the asymptotic expansion

Here, the right hand side is clearly not convergent for any non-zero value of t. Substituting  and noting that  results in the asymptotic expansion given earlier in this article.

Properties

Uniqueness for a given asymptotic scale
For a given asymptotic scale  the asymptotic expansion of function  is unique. That is the coefficients  are uniquely determined in the following way:

where  is the limit point of this asymptotic expansion (may be ).

Non-uniqueness for a given function
A given function  may have many asymptotic expansions (each with a different asymptotic scale).

Subdominance
An asymptotic expansion may be asymptotic expansion to more than one function.

See also

Related fields
 Asymptotic analysis
 Singular perturbation

Asymptotic methods
 Watson's lemma
 Mellin transform
 Laplace's method
 Stationary phase approximation
 Method of steepest descent

Notes

References
 Ablowitz, M. J., & Fokas, A. S. (2003). Complex variables: introduction and applications. Cambridge University Press.
 Bender, C. M., & Orszag, S. A. (2013). Advanced mathematical methods for scientists and engineers I: Asymptotic methods and perturbation theory. Springer Science & Business Media.
 Bleistein, N., Handelsman, R. (1975), Asymptotic Expansions of Integrals, Dover Publications.
 Carrier, G. F., Krook, M., & Pearson, C. E. (2005). Functions of a complex variable: Theory and technique. Society for Industrial and Applied Mathematics.
 Copson, E. T. (1965), Asymptotic Expansions, Cambridge University Press.
 .
 Erdélyi, A. (1955), Asymptotic Expansions, Dover Publications.
 Fruchard, A., Schäfke, R. (2013), Composite Asymptotic Expansions, Springer.
 Hardy, G. H. (1949), Divergent Series, Oxford University Press.
 Olver, F. (1997). Asymptotics and Special functions. AK Peters/CRC Press.
 Paris, R. B., Kaminsky, D. (2001), Asymptotics and Mellin-Barnes Integrals, Cambridge University Press.
 Whittaker, E. T., Watson, G. N. (1963), A Course of Modern Analysis, fourth edition, Cambridge University Press.

External links
 
 Wolfram Mathworld: Asymptotic Series

Mathematical analysis
Complex analysis
Asymptotic analysis
Mathematical series